The WinChip series was a low-power Socket 7-based x86 processor designed by Centaur Technology and marketed by its parent company IDT.

Overview

Design
The design of the WinChip was quite different from other processors of the time. Instead of a large gate count and die area, IDT, using its experience from the RISC processor market, created a small and electrically efficient processor similar to the 80486, because of its single pipeline and in-order execution microarchitecture. It was of much simpler design than its Socket 7 competitors, such as AMD K5/K6, which were superscalar and based on dynamic translation to buffered micro-operations with advanced instruction reordering (out of order execution).

Use
WinChip was, in general, designed to perform well with popular applications that did few (if any) floating point calculations. This included operating systems of the time and the majority of software used in businesses. It was also designed to be a drop-in replacement for the more complex, and thus more expensive, processors it was competing with. This allowed IDT/Centaur to take advantage of an established system platform (Intel's Socket 7).

Later developments
WinChip 2, an update of C6, retained the simple in-order execution pipeline of its predecessor, but added dual MMX/3DNow! processing units that could operate in superscalar execution. This made it the only non-AMD CPU on Socket 7 to support 3DNow! instructions. WinChip 2A added fractional multipliers and adopted a 100 MHz front side bus to improve memory access and L2 cache performance. It also adopted a performance rating nomenclature instead of reporting the real clock speed, similar to contemporary AMD and Cyrix processors.

Another revision, the WinChip 2B, was also planned. This featured a die shrink to 0.25 μm, but was only shipped in limited numbers.

A third model, the WinChip 3, was planned as well. This was meant to receive a doubled L1 cache, but the W3 CPU never made it to market.

Performance
Although the small die size and low power-usage made the processor notably inexpensive to manufacture, it never gained much market share. WinChip C6 was a competitor to the Intel Pentium and Pentium MMX, Cyrix 6x86, and AMD K5/K6. It performed adequately, but only in applications that used little floating point math. Its floating point performance was simply well below that of the Pentium and K6, being even slower than the Cyrix 6x86.

Decline
The industry's move away from Socket 7 and the release of the Intel Celeron processor signalled the end of the WinChip. In 1999, the Centaur Technology division of IDT was sold to VIA. Although VIA branded the processors as "Cyrix", the company initially used technology similar to the WinChip in its Cyrix III line.

Data

Winchip C6 (0.35 µm)

 All models supported MMX
 The 88 mm die was made using a 0.35 micron 4-layer metal CMOS technology.
 The 64 Kib L1 Cache of the WinChip C6 used a 32 KB 2-way set associative code cache and a 32 KB 2-way set associative data cache.

WinChip 2 (0.35 µm)

 All models supported MMX and 3DNow!
 The 95 mm die was made using a 0.35 micron 5-layer metal CMOS technology.
 The 64 Kib L1 Cache of the WinChip 2 used a 32 KB 2-way set associative code cache and a 32 KB 4-way set associative data cache.

WinChip 2A (0.35 µm)

 
 All models supported MMX and 3DNow!
 The 95 mm die was made using a 0.35 micron 5-layer metal CMOS technology.
 The 64 Kib L1 Cache of the WinChip 2A used a 32 KB 2-way set associative code cache and a 32 KB 4-way set associative data cache.

WinChip 2B (0.25 µm)

 All models supported MMX and 3DNow!
 The 58 mm die was made using a 0.25 micron 5-layer metal CMOS technology.
 The 64 Kib L1 Cache of the WinChip 2B used a 32 KB 2-way set associative code cache and a 32 KB 4-way set associative data cache.
 Dual-voltage CPU: while the processor core operates at 2.8 Volt, the external input/output (I/O) voltages remain 3.3 volts for backwards compatibility.

WinChip 3 (0.25 µm)
 All models supported MMX and 3DNow!
 The 75 mm die was made using a 0.25 micron 5-layer metal CMOS technology.
 The 128 Kib L1 Cache of the WinChip 3 used a 64 KB 2-way set associative code cache and a 64 KB 4-way set associative data cache.
 Dual-voltage CPU: while the processor core operates at 2.8 volts, the external input/output (I/O) voltages remain 3.3 volts for backwards compatibility.

See also 
 List of VIA microprocessors

References

External links

 
 CPU-INFO: IDT C6, in-depth processor history
 VIA CPU Overview at CPUShack
 WinChip architecture at Sandpile.org
 WinChip2 architecture at Sandpile.org
 CPUPages W2B
 Winchip W2, W2A, W2B UKcpu
 Winchip2B

IDT